The molecular formula C12H18BrNO2 (molar mass: 288.18 g/mol, exact mass: 287.0521 u) may refer to:

 Methyl-DOB, or 4-bromo-2,5-dimethoxy-N-methylamphetamine
 N-Ethyl-2C-B

Molecular formulas